Herbert Hiram Hyman (March 3, 1918 – December 18, 1985) was an American sociologist and expert on opinion polling. He taught at Columbia University from 1951 to 1969 and at Wesleyan University from 1969 to 1985. He died in Canton, China on December 18, 1985, four days after suffering a heart attack. He had been in China to deliver a series of lectures at Zhongshan University on sociology in developing countries.

References

External links
Profile at SNAC

1918 births
1985 deaths
Scientists from New York City
American sociologists
Columbia University alumni
Columbia University faculty
Wesleyan University faculty